Vapi INA is a town (part of Vapi city) and an industrial notified area in Valsad district in the Indian state of Gujarat.

Demographics
 India census, Vapi INA had a population of 23,845. Males constitute 55% of the population and females 45%. Vapi INA has an average literacy rate of 81%, higher than the national average of 72%: male literacy is 83%, and female literacy is 77%. In Vapi INA, 13% of the population is under 6 years of age.

References

Cities and towns in Valsad district